The U.S. state of Louisiana is divided into 64 parishes (French: paroisses, Spanish: parroquias) in the same manner that Alaska is divided into boroughs, and the remaining 48 other states are divided into counties. Louisiana's usage of the term "parish" for a geographic region or local government dates back to the Spanish colonial and French colonial periods.

Thirty-eight parishes are governed by a council called a Police Jury. The remaining 26 have various other forms of government, including: council-president, council-manager, parish commission, and consolidated parish/city.

History
Louisiana was formed from French and Spanish colonies, which were both officially Roman Catholic. Local colonial government was based upon parishes, as the local ecclesiastical division.

Following the Louisiana Purchase in 1803, the territorial legislative council divided the Territory of Orleans (the predecessor of Louisiana state) into 12 counties. The borders of these counties were poorly defined, but they roughly coincided with the colonial parishes, and hence used the same names.

On March 31, 1807, the territorial legislature created 19 parishes without abolishing any of the old counties (which term continued to exist until 1845). In 1811, a constitutional convention was held to prepare for Louisiana's admission into the Union. This organized the state into seven judicial districts, each consisting of groups of parishes. In 1816, the first official map of the state used the term parish, as did the 1845 constitution. Since then, the official term for Louisiana's primary civil divisions has been parishes.

The 19 original parishes were joined by Catahoula Parish in 1808. In 1810 four additional parishes were created from the formerly Spanish West Florida territory- these are part of what is now referred to as the Florida Parishes.

By April 1812, Attakapas Parish became St. Martin Parish and St. Mary Parish. On April 30, the state was admitted to the Union with 25 parishes.

By 1820, Washington Parish was added, and Feliciana Parish split into West and East in 1824. The next year, Jefferson Parish was carved from Orleans Parish. By 1830, Claiborne Parish was created, and the old Warren Parish was mostly absorbed into Ouachita Parish, only to return as Carroll Parish a few years later.

In 1838, Caddo Parish was created from Natchitoches, as were Madison and Caldwell parishes in the east. In 1839, Union Parish was formed from Ouachita, and Calcasieu was formed from St. Landry in 1840.

Five parishes were created in 1843: Bossier, DeSoto, Franklin, Sabine, and Tensas. Morehouse Parish and Vermilion Parish were formed from Ouachita and Lafayette parishes, respectively, in 1844. The next year, Jackson Parish was formed, the old county units were abandoned, and the units were officially referred to as "parishes". In 1848, Bienville Parish was formed from Claiborne Parish. In 1852, Winn Parish was formed, while parishes further south added and lost land.

In 1853, Lafourche Interior Parish was renamed to Lafourche Parish. During Reconstruction, state government created a number of new parishes, with the first being Iberia and Richland parishes. Plans for creating a parish like Iberia from St. Martin and St. Mary parishes had dated from the 1840s. (A surveying error in Iberia's creation broke St. Martin Parish into two non-contiguous parts, making it and Norfolk County, Massachusetts as the only county-level units with their own exclaves.) Tangipahoa and Grant parishes followed in 1869. In 1870, the fifth Reconstruction parish, Cameron, was created, which was followed by the sixth, seventh, and eighth parishes (Red River, Vernon, and Webster, respectively) in 1871. The ninth parish to be formed under Radical Republican rule was Lincoln, named after the late president and formed in 1873. In 1877, the old parish of Carroll divided into East and West Carroll parishes, which are unofficially called the tenth and eleventh Reconstruction parishes, as the project ended that year.

No new parishes were formed until 1886, when Acadia Parish was formed from St. Landry. Again, no new parishes were formed, this time until 1908, when the western half of Catahoula parish became LaSalle parish.

In 1910, the parish count rose to 61 with the creation of Evangeline Parish, and the 62nd, 63rd, and 64th parishes (Allen, Beauregard, and Jefferson Davis) were created from areas of Calcasieu Parish. There were several minor boundary changes afterward, the most substantial being the division of Lake Pontchartrain among Tangipahoa, St. Tammany, Orleans, Jefferson, St. John the Baptist, and St. Charles Parishes in 1979.

Listing

|}

Former parishes
 Attakapas Parish existed from 1805 to 1811.
 Biloxi Parish formed in 1811 from West Florida territory. It was eliminated in 1812 when it was transferred to the Mississippi Territory.
 Carroll Parish formed in 1838 from part of Ouachita Parish. In 1877, it was divided into East Carroll Parish and West Carroll Parish.
 Feliciana Parish formed in 1810 from West Florida territory. In 1824, it was divided into East Feliciana Parish and West Feliciana Parish.
 German Coast Parish existed from 1805 to 1807.
 Opelousas Parish, renamed to St. Landry Parish in 1805
 Pascagoula Parish formed in 1811 from West Florida territory. It was eliminated in 1812 when it was transferred to the Mississippi Territory.
 Warren Parish formed in 1811 from part of Concordia Parish, and merged into Concordia Parish and Ouachita Parish in 1814.

Counties in 1803 
The original twelve counties (later, parishes) defined by the Territorial Legislative Council in 1803 were:
 Acadia Parish
 Attakapas County
 Concordia Parish
 German Coast County 
 Iberville Parish
 Lafourche Parish
 Natchitoches Parish
 Opelousas County
 Orleans County
 Ouachita Parish
 Pointe Coupee Parish
 Rapides Parish

In 1807, German Coast County was divided into several different parishes, when the Territorial Council revised the list from 12 to 19. Similarly, in 1811 Attakapas County was subdivided. The names German Coast and Attakapas were dropped when the counties were divided, merged or changed into parishes.

Fictional parishes

 In the novels Little Altars Everywhere, Divine Secrets of the Ya-Ya Sisterhood, and Ya-Yas in Bloom, author Rebecca Wells created the fictional Garnet Parish.
 The movie Steel Magnolias was said to take place in the fictional Chinquapin Parish, likely a suburban parish of Shreveport. However, the movie was shot in Natchitoches, and involved several elements of culture indicative of the town and parish of the same name. For example, the annual Christmas Festival of Lights in Natchitoches is shown, as are Cajun dance styles with a distinctive country-Cajun band. (Natchitoches is in the Crossroads region of Louisiana, where southern Louisiana's predominantly Catholic, Cajun culture meets the primarily Protestant, Anglo culture of northern Louisiana.)
 Part of Walter Jon Williams' novel The Rift is set in the fictional Spottswood Parish.
 The Southern Vampire Mysteries series of novels written by Charlaine Harris and HBO's True Blood, which is based on the novels, take place in the fictional northwestern Louisiana Renard Parish.
 In the movie In the Electric Mist, Deputy Jason J. Bayard was from the fictional St. Clare Parish.
 In the DC Comics Universe, Belle Reve Parish is a parish in Louisiana that contains the Bell Reve Penitentiary.
 In the movie The Green Mile, a fictional parish named Trapingus Parish is featured in the movie. The film was actually shot in Tennessee.
 In the Cinemax TV series Banshee, Chayton Littlestone is seen fighting in the fictional Sang Tholis Parish, which is said to be in New Orleans. "Sang" is the French word for "blood", but could also be a dialect for "sans", without. "Tholis" is not a French word. In reality, the city of New Orleans is located entirely in Orleans Parish. 
 In the movie Doctor Detroit, protagonist Clifford Skridlow (played by Dan Aykroyd) appears in a Detroit court as a stereotypical (based on "Atticus Finch" in To Kill a Mockingbird) Southern attorney from Bay Saint Louis Parish.
 In the 2017 video game Resident Evil 7: Biohazard, the vast majority of the game takes place in the fictional Dulvey Parish, somewhere on the coast.
 The "Faster, Baby!" DLC for Mafia III, also a 2017 video game, takes place in Sinclair Parish just west of the fictional city of 'New Bordeaux', a fictional version of New Orleans set in 1968.
 In the 1978 James Bond film Live and Let Die, Sheriff J.W. Pepper (Clifton James) of Pontrain Parish is featured as a supporting character. The parish name is likely derived from the real Lake Pontchartrain. 
 In Season 2 of Designated Survivor a flu outbreak originates in South Carroll Parish.
 The television series Queen Sugar is set in St. Josephine Parish, which borders Orleans Parish and is where the titular family; the Bordelon's, reside.
 The 2006 sequel movie Road House 2 is set in the coastal Tyree Parish.
 The 2011 crime thriller film Catch .44 takes place in Civil Parish, with one of the antagonists stealing a parish sheriff deputy's uniform. 
 The 2013 action thriller Homefront takes place in the fictional Labranche Parish, possibly named after or inspired by the real LaBranche Plantation Dependency.
 The 2014 supernatural horror film Jessabelle is set in the fictional Feliciana Parish, a genericised version of West Feliciana Parish.
 In the DC Universe series Swamp Thing, the primary setting is Montrivelle Parish. The county seat of the parish is the also fictional city of Marais.

See also 
 List of United States counties and county equivalents

References

 
Louisiana
Louisiana geography-related lists